The Ministry of the Pen was a ministerial position in Tunisia between 1860 and the end of the monarchical regime in 1957.

Bach kateb
The Minister of the Pen replaced the former role of the Bey's principal secretary (bach kateb). The bach katebs under each ruler were:

Hussein Bey: Belhassen Sehili and :fr:Hussein Khouja
Ali Bey: Abdellatif Sehili then Abderrahmane Baklouti
Mohamed Rachid Bey: :fr:Ahmed Lasram
Ali II Bey: Abderrahmane Baklouti
Hammouda Pasha: Abderrahmane Baklouti, :fr:Hammouda Ben Abdelaziz, Mohamed Darnaoui, :fr:Mohamed Lasram III
Hussein II Bey: :fr:Mahmoud Lasram
Mustapha Bey: :fr:Mohamed Lasram IV
Ahmed Bey, Mohammed Bey and Sadok Bey: Mohamed Lasram IV with vacanct periods until 1861

Mohamed Lasram IV fell out with Mustapha Khaznadar and resigned from his post, only becoming bach kateb once again in 1855 under Mohammed Bey.  At his death in 1861 the post fell vacant, until Sadok Bey appointed Mohammed Aziz Bouattour, a prominent young scribe at court favoured by the Grand Vizier Mustapha Khaznadar in 1864. A few months later, during the constitution of the first modern Tunisian government, the Ministry of the Pen was created, with Bouattour as the first office-holder.

Role and responsibilities
Headed by the Minister of the Pen, the ministry included the Diwan el Incha (chancellery) composed of several secretaries and scribes working in Arabic and Turkish (Tunisia was officially a province of the Ottoman Empire) as well as in various other consular languages such as French and Italian. This chancellery was permanently based in Dar El Bey in the medina of Tunis. Its holder was responsible for drafting and presenting acts and decrees (amr) for the signature of the sovereign or his keeper of the seals (saheb ettabaa). In addition, he was responsible for keeping the sovereign's correspondence with the administration and state institutions, such as the Sharia councils, the diwan of Tunis, or the Ottoman general staff. He was also required to send the Beylical orders to the various provinces of the regency of Tunis.

Under the French protectorate, the ministry was reorganized to house both the chancellery and the central administration of the qaids the interior: it gradually became a sort of interior ministry. It was indeed renamed as the Ministry of the Interior during the second government of Mohamed Chenik in 1950, under Lamine Bey.

Officeholders

References

Government ministers of Tunisia
18th century in Tunisia
19th century in Tunisia